Overill Dwyer-Brown (born 4 January 1961) is a Jamaican hurdler. She competed in the women's 400 metres hurdles at the 1984 Summer Olympics.

References

1961 births
Living people
Athletes (track and field) at the 1984 Summer Olympics
Jamaican female hurdlers
Olympic athletes of Jamaica
Place of birth missing (living people)